Elza Erkip is a Turkish-American electrical and computer engineer, professor and wireless technology researcher at New York University.

Education

Erkip received her B.S. in Electrical and Electronics Engineering from Middle East Technical University in Turkey, and her M.S. and Ph.D. (1996, under Thomas Cover) in Electrical Engineering from Stanford University. She ranked among the top 1% of highly cited scholars in computer science from 2002-2012 according to Thomson Reuters.

Background

Erkip is one of the researchers at NYU WIRELESS, where they are currently conducting indepth research into 5G wireless cell technology using millimeter wave (mmWave) wireless communications. She is also a fellow and member of the Board of Governors of IEEE, and a member of The Science Academy Society of Turkey.

Awards
 IEEE Fellow, 2011
 Finalist, The New York Academy of Sciences Blavatnik Awards for Young Scientists, 2010
 Best Paper Award, IEEE ICC Communication Theory Symposium, 2007
 Student Paper Award, co-author, IEEE International Symposium on Information Theory, 2007
 IEEE Communications Society Stephen O. Rice Paper Prize in the Field of Communication Theory, 2004
 National Science Foundation CAREER Award, 2001

References

Computer engineers
Turkish women computer scientists
Turkish computer scientists
American people of Turkish descent
Fellow Members of the IEEE
Electrical engineers
Living people
Middle East Technical University alumni
Stanford University alumni
Polytechnic Institute of New York University faculty
Year of birth missing (living people)